Roy Oldfield Calvert,  (31 October 1913 – 26 March 2002) was an officer of the Royal New Zealand Air Force (RNZAF) during the Second World War. He is one of only four New Zealand born airmen to receive two Bars to his Distinguished Flying Cross.

Flying career
Calvert was born on 31 October 1913 in Cambridge, a small town in the Waikato region of New Zealand's North Island.  He was educated at Cambridge Primary School and between 1926 and 1929, King's College School in Auckland. Before joining the RNZAF Calvert was a wool grader in the Cambridge district.

Calvert volunteered for the RNZAF very early on in the war and was eventually accepted in December 1940. He began training at the Ground Training School, Wereroa, near Levin. At the completion of this course in May 1941, he received his Wings as a qualified RNZAF pilot. Calvert was posted Liverpool, England, via Canada and sent to No 2 School of Navigation, at RAF Cranage, where he trained in navigation on the Avro Anson light bomber. On 14 April 1942, Calvert was posted to No. 50 Squadron based at RAF Skellingthorpe. Two days later he flew his first operational mission in a Manchester on a night raid on Lille, France. Despite their unreliable engines, Calvert enjoyed flying Manchesters.

Distinguished Flying Cross
Along with his navigator, Calvert was awarded the Distinguished Flying Cross in October 1942 for his part in several combat missions over hostile territory including the 94-bomber raid on the Le Creusot armament factory, whilst flying both Manchesters and Lancasters. The citation read:

Bar to DFC
On the evening of 9/10 November 1942, Calvert flew an operation to Hamburg, almost at the end of his first tour. Approaching Denmark, towering cloud gave them icing problems that was so thick they could not see anything that would help identify position. Calvert turned south to run to the target by dead reckoning. Through a break in the clouds, Calvert spotted railway marshalling yards and prepared the aircraft for a bombing run. At that moment, the plane was hit by flak killing the wireless operator, smashing the navigators arm and peppering fragments of perspex and flak splinters into Calvert's face and arm. With radio and navigation aids out, aileron trim and rudder unserviceable, Calvert flew the badly damaged bomber back to England, crashlanding at Bradwell Bay on the Essex coast. After a stay in hospital, Calvert returned to base and was awarded a Bar to his DFC. The citation read:

Second Bar to DFC
At the end of his first tour, Calvert instructed for a year, but returned to flying operations in January 1944 with No. 630 Squadron based at East Kirkby, Lincolnshire. By August 1944 Calvert he had been promoted to acting squadron leader and was also acting commanding officer of the squadron for about two months. He was awarded a second Bar to his DFC on 15 September 1944, for service while flying with that squadron. His citation read:

Post-war
Calvert returned to New Zealand in late 1944 after he accepted the opportunity to join a group of New Zealanders about to return home through North America. He was discharged on 15 March 1945, returned to Cambridge and became a farmer for the rest of his working life. Calvert died on 26 March 2002, aged 88, after a battle with cancer. He was buried at the RSA Cemetery at Hautapu, Cambridge having lived in the town and district for all his pre and postwar life.

References

Further reading
 Hanson, Colin (2001). Honours and Awards in the Royal New Zealand Air Force 1923–1999. Published by Volplane Press, Christchurch, N.Z. . .

1913 births
2002 deaths
New Zealand military personnel of World War II
New Zealand World War II pilots
People from Cambridge, New Zealand
Recipients of the Distinguished Flying Cross (United Kingdom)
Royal New Zealand Air Force personnel